East Africa's Got Talent is a talent show competition that is part of the Got Talent franchise owned by Simon Cowell. It broadcasts simultaneously across four countries in East Africa: Kenya, Tanzania, Uganda and Rwanda.

Winners 
Season 1: Esther and Ezekiel

Judges

Season one
Jeff Koinange (Kenya)

Vanessa Mdee (Tanzania)

Makenda Mahadeo (Rwanda)

Gaetano Kagwa (Uganda)

Show structure
The show has two rounds of auditions. The first round referred to as, pre-auditions is held across different cities in each participating country. The second round, referred to as, theatre auditions are done later at a setting in front of Judges and live audience.

Preliminary auditions

The pre-auditions were held in major cities in each country which included Nairobi, Mombasa, Dar es Salaam, Kampala and Kigali.

Theater auditions

Once a performance is over, each judge will give an overview of what they thought about the act, before casting a vote.

The judges are allowed to use the golden buzzer to send an act directly to the semi finals. Each judge can only press the golden buzzer once throughout the entire season.

Deliberations

After the completion of theater auditions, the judges whittle down the acts to only eighteen to compete in the semi finals.

Live shows

Semi-finals

The live shows include three episodes of semifinals in which the successful eighteen acts from the auditions get to compete for a spot in the finals. In each episode, six acts perform. The act with the most public vote automatically goes through to the finals while the judges choose from the 2nd and 3rd respectively in the public vote. In case of a tie, the act placed 2nd in the public vote advances to the finals. A judge can buzz if not impressed with the act. The performance can be terminated if all the judges buzz the act.

Finals

The final episode operates using the same format as the semi finals, though this time the winner is determined purely by a public vote, with the finalists attempting to secure more votes than the others by performing a new routine at their best.

The host announces the results with the act gaining more public votes declared the winner. The winner receives a grand prize of 50 000 dollars.

Auditions
The show had two rounds of auditions. The first round referred to as, pre-auditions were held across different cities in each participating country. The second round, referred to as theatre auditions, were done later at a setting in front of judges and a live audience.

Preliminary auditions

The pre-auditions were held in major cities in each country.

Theater auditions

Theater auditions were held in Mpesa foundation academy, in Kenya in front of judges and a live audience. This event was pre recorded. The judges cast a vote to either eliminate an act or send it through to the next stage.

Golden Buzzer

The judges had a choice to press the golden buzzer which sends an act direct to the semi finals.

The first Judge to press the golden buzzer was Vanessa Mdee for Uganda's 7year old, Leyna Kagere.

Jeff Koinange pressed his second golden buzzer for Tanzania's Team Makochokocho.

The third golden buzzer from Makeda went to Hoziyana Peace (23) from Rwanda.

The last golden buzzer was pressed by Gaetano Kagwa for Uganda's Jehova Shalom Acapella.

Participants 
These participants made it past theatre auditions by securing at least three yes from the judges.

 Winner

 Runners up

 Golden Buzzer - Auditions

Semi-finals 
The Semi finals were filmed live at Catholic University of Eastern Africa

Eighteen acts that got through from the theatre auditions battled it out in a heated competition to secure a place in the final six.  Six acts performed each week and only two made the cut. 
 Buzzed Out |  Judges' choice | 
 |

Semi-finals 1 (September 15)
Guest Performer, Results Show: Nandy

Non-competition performances

Semi-finals 2 (September 22) 

Guest Performer, Results Show: Serro

Non-competition performances

Semi-finals 3(September 29) 

Guest Performer, Results Show: Bruce Melodie

Final

Finale (October 6) 
The Finale was filmed live at Catholic University of Eastern Africa.
  | 

6 acts had to step up their game and battle it out for the grand prize of $50,000.

Guest Performer, Results Show: Ommy Dimpoz.

Awards
The winners won $50,000, c. KES 5,000,000.

Controversy
Concerns were raised about the Burundian drummers not coming from the four participating countries namely Uganda, Rwanda, Kenya and Tanzania. The producers of the show released a statement clarifying that the group members were legal residents of Rwanda and had all the rights to participate as participation was open to anyone from the four countries.

References 

2019 television series debuts
2019 television series endings
Kenyan reality television series
Got Talent
Citizen TV original programming